Jazmin Felix-Hotham (born 2 July 2000) is a New Zealand rugby sevens player. She plays for the Black Ferns Sevens and represents Waikato provincially.

Rugby career

2017–2018 
Hotham was still attending Hamilton Girls' High School when she was given a development contract with the Black Ferns Sevens team. In 2017, she helped her school win the National Condors title and also scored the winning try in the World Schools Sevens final.

Hotham was initially chosen to captain the New Zealand girls’ sevens team to the 2018 Youth Olympics, but was ruled out due to a shoulder injury she received while playing representative rugby.

2020–2021 
Hotham made her international debut for the Black Ferns sevens at the 2020 Sydney Women's Sevens. She was named as a travelling reserve for the 2021 Olympics squad in Tokyo.

2022 
Hotham was named in the Black Ferns squad for the 2022 Sevens Series. She made the Black Ferns Sevens squad for the 2022 Commonwealth Games in Birmingham. She won a bronze medal at the event. She later won a silver medal at the Rugby World Cup Sevens in Cape Town.

References

External links 
 Black Ferns Profile

2000 births
Living people
New Zealand female rugby union players
New Zealand female rugby sevens players
New Zealand women's international rugby sevens players
21st-century New Zealand women
Commonwealth Games bronze medallists for New Zealand
Commonwealth Games medallists in rugby sevens
Rugby sevens players at the 2022 Commonwealth Games
Medallists at the 2022 Commonwealth Games